Masaaki (written: , , , , , , , , , , , , , , , , , , , , , , , , ,  or ) is a masculine Japanese given name. Notable people with the name include:

, Japanese politician
, Japanese poet
, Japanese baseball player
, Japanese singer-songwriter
, Japanese baseball player
, Japanese politician
, Japanese judoka
, Japanese footballer
, Japanese footballer
, Japanese ninjutsu practitioner
, Japanese footballer
, Japanese food historian
, Japanese drummer
, Japanese footballer
, Japanese aviator
, Japanese baseball player
, Japanese business theorist
, Japanese daimyō
, Japanese politician
, Japanese Go player
, Japanese politician
, Japanese sport wrestler
, Japanese footballer and manager
, Japanese footballer
, Japanese academic
, Japanese guitarist
, Japanese baseball player
, Japanese footballer
, Japanese baseball player
, Japanese baseball player
, Japanese cross-country skier
, Japanese video game producer
, Japanese professional wrestler
, Japanese footballer
, Japanese baseball player and manager
, Japanese footballer
, Japanese photographer
, Japanese footballer
Masaaki Niwa, Japanese engineer
, Japanese kickboxer
, Japanese sumo wrestler
, Japanese communist and murderer
, Japanese politician
, Japanese anime director
, Japanese luger
, Japanese actor and singer
, Japanese rugby union player
, Japanese karateka, kickboxer and mixed martial artist
, Japanese footballer
, Japanese World War II flying ace
, Japanese economist and banker
, Japanese musician and conductor
, Japanese writer
, Japanese politician
, Japanese footballer
, Japanese writer
, Japanese politician
, Japanese football referee
, Japanese voice actor
, Japanese businessman
, Japanese karateka
, Japanese guitarist and DJ
, Japanese physicist
, Japanese politician
, Japanese footballer and manager
, Japanese anime director, animator and screenwriter

See also
 Masaki (disambiguation)

Japanese masculine given names